Eagle Ridge Golf Club may refer to:
 Eagle Ridge Golf Club, Fort Myers, Florida
 Eagle Ridge Golf Club, Gilroy, California
 Eagle Ridge Golf Club, Lakewood, New Jersey
 Eagle Ridge Golf Club, Raleigh, North Carolina
 Eagle Ridge Golf Club, Summerfield, Florida
 Eagle Ridge Golf Club, Williston, North Dakota